On the Lam is the third studio album by American sludge metal band Cavity released on 23 October 2001 on the Hydra Head Records label. The album was recorded during the month of December 2000 at Dungeon Studios in the band's home state of Florida and was produced by the band and Jeremy Du Bois. The album was well received by music critics with some calling it their most accessible album to date and Eduardo Rivadavia of AllMusic went so far as to call the album "remarkable".

Composition and reception
On the Lam is essentially sludge metal and the band makes extensive use of guitar feedback which was described as a musical theme across the album.    
AllMusic's Eduardo Rivadavia went on to say of the album: "they don't so much compose music as harness feedback, their songs are barely cognizant of traditional rock & roll structures and utterly ignorant of commercial aspirations, comprising a gloriously disorganized whole." He concluded his review with "A dense, difficult work to digest, On the Lam leaves a lasting first impression nonetheless, for lovers of unpredictable, unorthodox, and of course extremely heavy music."

In a March 2002 Exclaim! review, Chris Ayers described the album as "more groove-based but no less heavy" while band founder and bassist Daniel Gorostiaga explained in the review that this was the first album where all band members contributed to the writing and composition process saying "It's really the first time we've done that so effectively; basically on albums like Laid Insignificant, I wrote most of the music." Discussing Cavity and On the Lam's similarities to Eyehategod, Gorostiaga said "Eyehategod are more popular than us, but I do recognize the comparisons because we both came from the same roots of punk/hardcore and metal."

Track listing

Personnel
Cavity
 Rene Barge – vocals
 Ryan Wienstein – guitar & piano
 Jason Landrian – guitar  
 Daniel Gorostiaga - bass guitar
 Jorge Alvarez - drums

Technical personnel 
 Cavity & Jeremy Du Bois - production
 Jeremy Du Bois - engineering
 Art concept by Cavity
 Design and construction by A. Turner with assistance from J. Hellmann
 Original photos by Benjamin Carrillo

References

2001 albums
Cavity (band) albums
Hydra Head Records albums